Jonathan Jacob Torres Hernández (born 11 December 1977) is a Spanish former professional footballer who played as a forward.

Career
Torres started his career with Tenerife B and Valencia B between 1996 and 1999, scoring two goals in a total of thirty-three appearances. In 1999, fellow Segunda División B side Lanzarote signed Torres. He scored ten goals in his first season, including a hat-trick over Real Madrid B on 24 October 1999, which ended with relegation. Two years later, in 2002, Torres joined Tenerife of the Segunda División. He made his professional debut on 14 September, featuring for the final six minutes of a home draw with Oviedo. 2003 saw Torres play for Universidad LP, scoring eight goals in twenty fixtures as the club won the title prior to resigning for Tenerife.

In 2004, Gimnàstic completed the signing of Torres. He was part of the club's squad that won promotion to the 2004–05 Segunda División. Soon after, Torres was on the move again after agreeing to sign for Las Palmas. He then had spells with Terrassa, Portuense and Orihuela. Torres scored a total of twenty-seven goals across one hundred and nineteen matches for the aforementioned teams. Torres rejoined Lanzarote in 2008. Ahead of the 2009–10 Segunda División B, Torres agreed to join Alicante. He was sent off on debut, during a Copa del Rey win over Sporting Mahonés. 2010 saw Torres rejoin Lanzarote again, eventually leaving in 2011.

Torres joined regional side San Bartolomé in September 2018, having previously appeared for Teguise.

Personal life
Torres' brother, Santi, was also a footballer, playing alongside Torres at Lanzarote in his first and third spell with the club.

Career statistics

Honours
Universidad LP
Segunda División B: 2002–03

References

External links

1977 births
Living people
People from Arrecife
Sportspeople from the Province of Las Palmas
Spanish footballers
Association football forwards
Segunda División B players
Segunda División players
Tercera División players
CD Tenerife B players
Valencia CF Mestalla footballers
UD Lanzarote players
CD Tenerife players
Universidad de Las Palmas CF footballers
Gimnàstic de Tarragona footballers
UD Las Palmas players
Terrassa FC footballers
Racing Club Portuense players
Orihuela CF players
Alicante CF footballers
CD Teguise players